The following outline is provided as an overview of and introduction to poetry:

Poetry – a form of art in which language is used for its aesthetic qualities, in addition to, or instead of, its apparent meaning.

What type of thing is poetry?
Poetry can be described as all of the following things:

 One of the arts – as an art form, poetry is an outlet of human expression, that is usually influenced by culture and which in turn helps to change culture. Poetry is a physical manifestation of the internal human creative impulse. 
 A form of literature – literature is composition, that is, written or oral work such as books, stories, and poems.
 Fine art – in Western European academic traditions, fine art is art developed primarily for aesthetics, distinguishing it from applied art that also has to serve some practical function. The word "fine" here does not so much denote the quality of the artwork in question, but the purity of the discipline according to traditional Western European canons.

Types of poetry

Common poetic forms 

 Epic – lengthy narrative poem, ordinarily concerning a serious subject containing details of heroic deeds and events significant to a culture or nation. Milman Parry and Albert Lord have argued that the Homeric epics, the earliest works of Western literature, were fundamentally an oral poetic form. These works form the basis of the epic genre in Western literature. 
 Sonnet – poetic form which originated in Italy; Giacomo Da Lentini is credited with its invention. 
 Jintishi – literally "Modern Poetry", was actually composed from the 5th century onwards and is considered to have been fully developed by the early Tang dynasty. The works were principally written in five- and seven-character lines and involve constrained tone patterns, intended to balance the four tones of Middle Chinese within each couplet.
 Villanelle – nineteen-line poetic form consisting of five tercets followed by a quatrain. There are two refrains and two repeating rhymes, with the first and third line of the first tercet repeated alternately until the last stanza, which includes both repeated lines. The villanelle is an example of a fixed verse form.
 Tanka – a classical Japanese poem, composed in Japanese (rather than Chinese, as with kanshi)
 Ode – a poem written in praise of a person (e.g. Psyche), thing (e.g. a Grecian urn), or event
 Ghazal – an Arabic poetic form with rhyming couplets and a refrain, each line in the same meter
 Haiku – a poem, normally in Japanese but also in other languages (particularly English), normally with 17 syllables arranged as 5 + 7 + 5
 Free verse - an open form of poetry which does not use consistent meter patterns or rhyme, tending to follow the rhythm of natural speech

Periods, styles and movements 

 Augustan poetry – poetry written during the reign of Caesar Augustus as Emperor of Rome, particularly Virgil, Horace, and Ovid.
 Automatic poetry – Surrealist poetry written using the automatic method.
 Black Mountain – postmodern American poetry written in the mid-20th century, in Black Mountain College in North Carolina.
 Chanson de geste
 Classical Chinese poetry
 Concrete poetry
 Cowboy poetry
 Digital poetry
 Epitaph
 Fable
 Found poetry
 Haptic poetry
 Imagism
 Libel
 Limerick poetry
 Lyric poetry
 Metaphysical poetry
 Medieval poetry
 Microstory
 Minnesinger
 Modern Chinese poetry
 Modernist poetry
 The Movement
 Narrative poetry
 Objectivist
 Occasional poetry
 Odes and elegies
 Parable
 Parnassian
 Pastoral
 Performance poetry
 Post-modernist
 Prose poetry
 Romanticism
 San Francisco Renaissance
 Sound poetry
 Symbolism
 Troubadour
 Trouvère
 Visual poetry

History of poetry 

History of poetry – the earliest poetry is believed to have been recited or sung, such as in the form of hymns (such as the work of Sumerian priestess Enheduanna), and employed as a way of remembering oral history, genealogy, and law. Many of the poems surviving from the ancient world are recorded prayers, or stories about religious subject matter, but they also include historical accounts, instructions for everyday activities, love songs, and fiction.
 List of years in poetry

Elements of poetry 

 Accents
 Caesura
 Couplets – a pair of lines of meter in poetry. It usually consists of two lines that rhyme and have the same meter. While traditionally couplets rhyme, not all do.
 Elision
 Foot
 Intonation
 Meter
 Mora
 Prosody
 Rhythm
 Scansion
 Stanza
 Syllable

Methods of creating rhythm

Scanning meter 

 spondee – two stressed syllables together
 iamb – unstressed syllable followed by a stressed syllable
 trochee – one stressed syllable followed by an unstressed syllable
 dactyl – one stressed syllable followed by two unstressed syllables
 anapest – two unstressed syllables followed by one stressed syllable

The number of metrical feet in a line are described in Greek terminology as follows:
 dimeter – two feet
 trimeter – three feet
 tetrameter – four feet
 pentameter – five feet
 hexameter – six feet
 heptameter – seven feet
 octameter – eight feet

Common metrical patterns 

 Iambic pentameter
 Example: Paradise Lost, by John Milton
 Dactylic hexameter
 Examples:
 Iliad, by Homer
 The Metamorphoses, by Ovid
 Iambic tetrameter
 Examples:
 To His Coy Mistress, by Andrew Marvell
 Eugene Onegin, by Aleksandr Pushkin
 Trochaic octameter
 Example: The Raven, by Edgar Allan Poe
 Anapestic tetrameter
 Examples:
 The Hunting of the Snark, by Lewis Carroll
 Don Juan, by Lord Byron
 Alexandrine – also known as iambic hexameter.
 Example: Phèdre, by Jean Racine

Rhyme, alliteration and assonance 
 Alliteration
 Alliterative verse
 Assonance
 Consonance
 Internal rhyme
 Rhyme

Rhyming schemes 

 Chant royal
 Ottava rima
 Rubaiyat

Stanzas and verse paragraphs 

 2-line stanza: couplet or distich
 3-line stanza: triplet or tercet
 4-line stanza: quatrain
 5-line stanza: quintain or cinquain)
 6-line stanza: sestet
 8-line stanza: octet
 verse paragraph

Poetic diction

Poetics

Some famous poets and their poems 

 Anna Akhmatova
 Requiem
 Maya Angelou
 On the Pulse of Morning
 Ludovico Ariosto
 Orlando Furioso
 W. H. Auden
 Musée des Beaux Arts
 September 1, 1939
 Matsuo Bashō
 Natsu no Tsuki (Summer Moon)
Charles Baudelaire
Les Fleurs du Mal
 William Blake
 The Chimney Sweeper
 The Sick Rose
 London
 Geoffrey Chaucer
 The Complaint of Mars
 Samuel Coleridge
 The Rime of the Ancient Mariner
 Dante
 Divine Comedy
 Kamala Das
 The Descendants
 Emily Dickinson
 "Hope" is the thing with feathers
 "Why do I love" You, Sir
 "Faith" is a fine invention
 John Donne
 Devotions upon Emergent Occasions
 Elegy XIX: To His Mistress Going to Bed
 Rita Dove
 Thomas and Beulah (collection)
 John Dryden
 Absalom and Achitophel
 Mac Flecknoe
 T. S. Eliot
 The Waste Land
 Ferdowsi
 Shahnameh
 Robert Frost
 The Road Not Taken
 Nothing Gold Can Stay
 Mirza Ghalib
 Goethe
 Homer
 Iliad
 Odyssey
 Gerard Manley Hopkins
 Binsey Poplars
 Horace
 Epistles (collection)
Victor Hugo
Les Contemplations
 Alfred Edward Housman
 To An Athlete Dying Young
 Omar Khayyám
 Rubaiyat of Omar Khayyam (Translated Collection)
 John Keats
 Sleep and Poetry
 Jan Kochanowski 
 Laments (Translated Collection)
 Ignacy Krasicki
 Fables and Parables
Jean de La Fontaine
 Mikhail Lermontov
 Boyarin Orsha
 Li Bai 
 Quiet Night Thought
Stéphane Mallarmé
L'après-midi d'un faune
 W.S. Merwin
 Czesław Miłosz
 John Milton
 Paradise Lost
 Pablo Neruda
 Twenty Love Poems and a Song of Despair (Collection)
 Ovid
 Ars Amatoria (Collection)
 Petrarch
 Il Canzoniere (Collection)
 Sylvia Plath
 Lady Lazarus
 Edgar Allan Poe
 The Raven
 Alexander Pope
 The Rape of the Lock
 Ezra Pound
 The Cantos
 Alexander Pushkin
 Ruslan and Ludmila
 Rainer Maria Rilke
 Duino Elegies
 Arthur Rimbaud
 Le Bateau ivre (The Drunken Boat)
 Jalal ad-Din Rumi
 Masnavi
 William Shakespeare
 Shakespeare's sonnets
 Shel Silverstein
 Where the Sidewalk Ends (Collection)
 Edmund Spenser
 The Faerie Queene
 Philip Sidney
 The Countess of Pembroke's Arcadia
 Tasso
 Jerusalem Delivered
 Alfred Tennyson, 1st Baron Tennyson
 Break, Break, Break
 The Charge of the Light Brigade
 Tears, Idle Tears
François Villon
 Virgil
 Aeneid
 Derek Walcott
 Omeros
 Walt Whitman
 Song of Myself
 Out of the Cradle Endlessly Rocking
 William Wordsworth
 The Prelude
 William Butler Yeats
 Sailing to Byzantium
 Swift's Epitaph (Translation)

See also 

 Glossary of poetry terms
 Glossary of literary terms

References

Further reading

External links 

 Poetry Out Loud List of Poems
 Poetry archives

poetry
poetry
 1
 1

Poetry-related lists